Sidhartha Babu is an Indian self-taught, international rifle shooter from Thiruvananthapuram, Kerala. He is currently based in Bengaluru. He has qualified for shooting at the 2020 Tokyo Paramlympics for Mixed 50m rifle prone SH1 through the Para World Shooting Championship (12-18 October 2019) held in Sydney, Australia.

Achievements 

 Won Bronze in Al Ain 2021 World Shooting World Cup
 Won Bronze for India in 2017 Para Shooting Worldcup
 Holds national record from 2014 (broke it himself in 2017 and 2018) in 50-m Prone Rifle Para Category
 South Indian 50-m Prone Rifle Shooting Champion (competing against able-bodied athletes)
 Won hat trick Gold medals in State Level 50-m Prone Rifle, Kerala State  (2016, 2017 and 2018) against able-bodied athletes

Career 
Mostly a self-taught shooter, Sidhartha learned the basics of shooting from reading books which he borrowed from the library. In a sport that requires high levels of concentration, precision and calmness, Sidhartha, despite his obvious physical shortcoming, is second to none.

He won the gold in 50m men's prone air rifle shooting in the 2016 Kerala State Shooting championship and it was for the first time that a differently-abled shooter had won the competition, competing with mainstream shooters. Sidhartha had also won a team bronze for India in para shooting World Cup that was held at Thailand in 2017.

Personal life 
Sidhartha Babu was a martial art enthusiast, who was teaching karate at the age of 19. A few years later he met with an accident that paralysed him. After that accident and few years later, he decided to try his luck at the rifle club in Idukki, Kerala state. Now, he is the current national champion and national record holder in para shooting. In 2018, he could train himself under olympic champion Sergei Martinov. In 2019, he participated in Para Shooting World Championship conducted in Sydney, Australia.

References 

1979 births
Living people
Indian male sport shooters
Paralympic shooters of India
Shooters at the 2020 Summer Paralympics